René Schneider (30 November 1936 – 18 September 2011) was a Swiss footballer. He played in four matches for the Switzerland national football team from 1959 to 1963.

References

1936 births
2011 deaths
Swiss men's footballers
Switzerland international footballers
Place of birth missing
Association footballers not categorized by position